bin Ibrahim or ben Ibrahim'' is an Arabic patronymic meaning "son of Ibrahim. Similarly, bint Ibrahim''' means "daughter of Ibrahim". 
Notable people with this patronymic include:

bin/ben
Abu Ja'far Aḥmad ben Yusuf ben Ibrahim
Adel bin Ibrahim Hkiml
Ahmad bin Ibrahim
Ahmad bin Ibrahim Badr
Al-Abbas bin Ibrahim as-Samlali
Anwar bin Ibrahim
Hamad bin Ibrahim Al Mualla
Hatim bin Ibrahim
Isa bin Ibrahim Al Khalifa
Mohammed bin Ibrahim Al Mutawa
Muhammad bin Ibrahim
Muhammad Faishal bin Ibrahim
Ramlan Bin Ibrahim
Salman bin Ibrahim Al Khalifa
Salman Bin Ibrahim Bin Mohammed Bin Ali Al-Kalifa
 Tunku Abdul Aziz bin Ibrahim
Waleed bin Ibrahim Al Ibrahim
Yahya bin Ibrahim

bint

Al Jawhara bint Ibrahim Al Ibrahim
Reem Bint Ibrahim Al Hashimy
Sabika bint Ibrahim Al Khalifa
Sameera bint Ibrahim Rajab

See also

Patronymics